Nakhunavo is a village in the Martvili Municipality of Samegrelo-Zemo Svaneti in western Georgia.

References
 Georgian Soviet Encyclopedia Vol. 7, 1984. 

Populated places in Samegrelo-Zemo Svaneti